Plazė (Plocis) is a lake about 8 km to the west of Kretingalė in Klaipėda District Municipality in West Lithuania. A blind has been constructed beside the lake so bird lovers can watch the lake’s water birds up close. It is 3 km by foot or bike from the nearest car park to the lake as cars are banned from the shore.

References 

Lakes of Lithuania